USS Pemiscot (AK-201) was an  that was constructed for the US Navy during the closing period of World War II. By the time she was scheduled for commissioning, the war's end caused her to be declared “excess to needs” and she was returned to the US Government and struck by the Navy.

Construction
Pemiscot was laid down under US Maritime Commission (MARCOM) contract, MC hull 2155, by Globe Shipbuilding Co., Superior, Wisconsin, 7 July 1944; launched 18 November 1944; and transferred down the Great Lakes and the Mississippi River to New Orleans, Louisiana, between January and April 1945. Completed at the Pendleton Shipyard Co., she was transferred to the Navy 12 September 1945 at New Orleans.

Service history 
Pemiscot was scheduled to commission 12 September. However, because of the Allied victory in the Pacific Ocean theatre of operations, her commissioning was delayed.

Inactivation
On 28 September she was ordered returned to the U.S. Maritime Commission, and was delivered to the War Shipping Administration (WSA) at New Orleans 31 October. Her name was struck from the Naval Register 5 December 1945. She was subsequently renamed Coastal Competitor.

Merchant service
Coastal Competitor was used by several shipping companies from 1945 to 1948, when she was placed in the reserve fleet.

On 13 July 1956, she was sold to Companhia Nacional de Navegacao Costerira, Patrimonio Nacional, of Brazil, for $693,682, under the condition that she be used for coastal shipping. She was delivered on 25 December 1956. The ship was scrapped in 1975.

References

Bibliography 

Online resources

External links

 

Alamosa-class cargo ships
Ships built in Superior, Wisconsin
1944 ships
World War II auxiliary ships of the United States
Pemiscot County, Missouri